The 2019 Judo Grand Prix Montreal was held in Montreal, Canada, from 5 to 7 July 2019.

Medal summary

Men's events
Source:

Women's events
Source: 

Source Results

Medal table

References

External links
 

2019 IJF World Tour
2019 Judo Grand Prix
Judo